The 2011 Pro Bowl was the National Football League's all-star game for the 2010 season. It took place at 7:00 p.m. EST (2:00 p.m. local time) on Sunday, January 30, 2011 at Aloha Stadium in Honolulu, Hawaii. The NFC won 55–41, despite leading 42-0.

Return to Hawaii
In 2010, the NFL's contract with Hawaii's Aloha Stadium expired, and commissioner (Roger Goodell) reviewed several options of locations for the Pro Bowl. Eventually, it was decided that the 2010 Pro Bowl would be played at Sun Life Stadium in Miami, Florida where Super Bowl XLIV would be held. Goodell also decided the Pro Bowl would be played before Super Bowl XLIV after "looking at alternatives to strengthen the Pro Bowl."

Soon after Goodell made the decision to play the 2010 Pro Bowl in Miami, it was immediately criticized by coaches and players such as Eli Manning, who said, "if the tradition continues, eventually the game will be held in cities that are not desirable vacation destinations."

As a result of backlash from players and critics about the decision to move the 2010 Pro Bowl to Miami, and the state of Hawaii offering a US$4,000,000 subsidy to the league, the NFL moved the game back to Hawaii for 2011, but the game remained before the Super Bowl for the second straight season. Therefore, players on the teams participating in Super Bowl XLV, the Green Bay Packers and the Pittsburgh Steelers, did not play in the Pro Bowl the Sunday prior.

Scoring summary

AFC roster

Offense

Defense

Special teams

NFC roster

Offense

Defense

Special teams

Notes:
bold denotes player who participated in game
Replacement selection due to injury or vacancy
Injured player; selected but did not play
Replacement starter; selected as reserve
"Need player"; named by coach
Selected but did not play because his team advanced to Super Bowl XLV
Griffin was selected as free safety
Vilma originally backed out of the game and was replaced by Henderson who played instead of him, but Vilma later decided to play and Henderson was inactive

Number of selections per team

References

http://www.jsonline.com/blogs/sports/129273523.html

External links
 Official Pro Bowl website at NFL.com
 

Pro Bowl
Pro Bowl
Pro Bowl
Pro
Pro Bowl
American football competitions in Honolulu
January 2011 sports events in the United States